German Umaralievich Sadulaev (Russian: Герман Умаралиевич Садулаев, born 2 February 1973) is a Chechen writer.

Biography 
German Sadulaev was born in 1973, in the town of Shali, in the Chechen-Ingush ASSR, to a Chechen father and Terek Cossack mother. His father's mother was also a Russian. Because his grandmother was a Russian, she and the children were not deported as part of Aardakh but the father, a Chechen, was, thus separating his father's nuclear family, until they were reunited when the Chechens were allowed to return from their exile in Central Asia. During his childhood, the Sadulaev family had views that were at times considered pro-Russian by other Chechens. Sadulaev himself speaks both fluent Chechen and fluent Russian, and identifies as an ethnic Chechen; according to traditional Chechen culture one is considered a member of the ethnic group as well as the specific teip by patrilineal descent. He was born into the teip of Ersenoy.

In 1989, aged sixteen, he left Chechnya to study law at Leningrad State University. Today he lives and works as a lawyer in St Petersburg.

German Sadulaev's first book, Radio FUCK, told city tales of the thirty-something generation in St Petersburg. It made no mention of Chechnya. With the publication of his second book, I am a Chechen!, critics acclaimed Sadulaev as "the literary find of the year" . Much more than a war novel, it was a lyrical fusion of exotic legends, stories and memories, nominated for the National Bestseller prize. Sadulaev's next work, Snowstorm, or The Myth of the End of the World, was a grotesque fantasy satire about social Darwinism. It won the Eureka prize. Sadulaev's fourth book, The Maya Pill, was shortlisted for the 2008 Russian Booker   and for the 2009 National Bestseller .

German Sadulaev's I am a Chechen! (translated by Anna Gunin) was published by Harvill Secker in 2010. The Maya Pill (translated by Carol Apollonio) will be published by Dalkey Archive Press in 2013.

In 2016, he ran for Duma as a representative of the Communist Party of the Russian Federation.

Works 
 Radio FUCK / Радио FUCK (2006)
 I am a Chechen! (2010) / Я – чеченец! (2006)
 Snowstorm, or The Myth of the End of the World / Пурга, или Миф о конце света (2008)
 The Maya Pill (2013) / Таблетка (2008)

External links 
 'Once Upon a Life' Article by German Sadulaev in the Observer magazine
 Newspaper interview In Metro, 2010
 Radio interview With Mark Coles, The Strand, BBC World Service, 2010
 Online texts 
 Rasskazy: New Fiction from a New Russia (Amazon)
 I am a Chechen! (Amazon)

Russian male novelists
1973 births
Chechen writers
Living people
Russian people of Chechen descent
Chechen people
Communist Party of the Russian Federation members